The Paramount Theatre in Los Angeles was a movie palace opened in January 1923 as Grauman's Metropolitan Theatre. It was built by impresario Sid Grauman, who had already built the Million Dollar Theatre a few blocks away, but who is best remembered today for his two Hollywood movie palaces, Grauman's Chinese Theatre and Grauman's Egyptian Theatre.

It was also home to variety acts. In 1941, Fats Waller, Rochester and Kitty Murray were all on the bill together. The theater became famous as the birthplace of "All That Meat and No Potatoes" – a Waller onstage wisecrack about the "brick house" physique of singer-dancer Murray.

The largest movie theater ever built in Los Angeles, the Metropolitan was acquired by the exhibition arm of Paramount Pictures in 1929 and renamed. The building had been designed by architect William Woolett, and the massive six-floor commercial and office block in which it was encased was a major landmark across from Pershing Square for several decades. Paramount operated the venue through the 1950s. It was closed in 1960 and demolished the following year to make way for a high rise office building which was never built. After the site served as a parking lot for many years, a building from the wholesale jewelry trade was erected on there in the late 1970s and remains today.

The theater was located at 6th and Hill Streets, one block west of Broadway, where most of the city's major theaters were then located. After the Metropolitan opened, Grauman decided to build an entrance on Broadway and constructed a building with a grand stairway up to a long hall which entered the theater on the mezzanine level, crossing a bridge over an alley to reach it. This entrance was closed by the Paramount company and the Broadway space rented out for retail use. When the theater was demolished, this annex survived and is today the only part of the theater that remains.

The theater was demolished and the 16-story International Jewelry Center was built on the site, opening in 1981 and as of 2020 still operating as such with jewelers and other office and retail occupants.

References

Cinemas and movie theaters in Los Angeles
Demolished theatres in Los Angeles
Former cinemas in the United States
Theatres completed in 1923
Buildings and structures demolished in 1961
1923 establishments in California
1960 disestablishments in California